Hayward Field is a track and field stadium in the northwest United States, located on the campus of the University of Oregon in Eugene, Oregon.  It has been the home of the university's track and field teams since 1921, and was the on-campus home of the varsity football team from 1919 through 1966. Track and field competitions at the stadium are organized by the not-for-profit organization TrackTown USA.

Hayward Field was named after track coach Bill Hayward (1868–1947), who ran the Ducks' program from 1904 to 1947. Renovated in 2004, it is one of only five International Association of Athletics Federations Class 1 certified tracks in the United States (along with Hutsell-Rosen Track, Icahn Stadium, John McDonnell Field, and Rock Chalk Park).

In 2018, the stadium was demolished and rebuilt on the same site. The new stadium is financed by UO's philanthropic community, with alumnus Phil Knight as the

History 
Hayward was built  in 1919 to replace Kincaid Field, and was intended to primarily serve the school's football  During halftime of the season opener that year, the venue was named for track coach Hayward; he was busy working as the team's trainer during the break, and did not know of the honor until the following day. In 1921, a six-lane cinder track was constructed around the football field. Renowned architect Ellis F. Lawrence designed the west grandstand, which opened in 1925. A natural grass field was first installed at Hayward Field in 1937; the surface was previously a mixture of dirt and sawdust. That field surface was not unique in the Northwest in the Pacific Coast Conference: Bell Field in Corvallis, Multnomah Stadium in Portland, and Husky Stadium in Seattle made similar transitions to natural grass in this period of time.

For most of its existence as a football venue, it was notorious for its poor playing conditions in rainy weather. Despite several improvement efforts, the field didn't drain very well even after the switch to grass, and often turned to mud.

In 1949, a 28-row grandstand in the south end zone was constructed; with temporary bleachers in adjacent corners, the venue's capacity was raised to 22,500 for football. Even with these changes, by the 1960s, the football team had long since outgrown Hayward Field, which was one of the smallest stadiums in the University Division (forerunner of Division I). Only 9,000 tickets were available to the general public. While nearly every seat was protected from the elements, it had little else going for it. It was in such poor condition that coaches deliberately steered prospective recruits away from it on their visits to Eugene.

Athletic director Leo Harris chafed at making the Ducks make the two-hour trip to Portland three times a year, and pressed for a new stadium on land just north of campus. School president Arthur Flemming was initially skeptical of the project, and asked Skidmore, Owings & Merrill to evaluate whether it was feasible to build the stadium on the northern site, expand Hayward Field to up to 40,000 seats (believed to be the minimum capacity for moving the entire home slate to Eugene), or build a new stadium on Hayward Field's footprint. The study definitively ruled out Hayward Field as the site for a new or renovated football stadium. SOM believed that city officials would never sign off on expanding Hayward Field since it hadn't been built to code, and there was no room to build a new stadium on Hayward's footprint.

As a result, Hayward Field's final varsity football game was played in 1966, a one-point loss to Washington State on  Its replacement, Autzen Stadium, opened in September 1967, and Hayward Field became a facility solely for track and field, except for a few freshman team football games.

Track widening 
The track was widened to eight lanes late in the summer of 1969 and converted to an all-weather surface that autumn. Its first synthetic track was Pro-Turf, a urethane and sand composite which led to a hard and fast surface; it produced many world records and gained a reputation as the world's fastest track. Light in color, it was resurfaced with the same in 1976.

Western grandstand 
The new west grandstand, also made of wood with a capacity of 4,300 spectators, was ready for use in March 1975. The Prefontaine Classic originated as the "Hayward Field Restoration Meet"  to help raise funds for a new

Conversion to metric 

The geometry of the track was changed to the international configuration, with shorter straights and longer turns. The surface was again Pro-Turf, but with different surface properties; a textured top layer and a reddish color. In addition, a 200 m warmup track was added to the southwest of the main track, along with a new hammer throw area and a weight room facility. A state-of-the-art scoreboard was added in 1991, which gave unofficial times and competitors' placings just seconds after race completion. This project was completed with a great deal of help from the Oregon Track Club as well as the efforts of many others. Bill McChesney SR who is the father of the Oregon 5K record holder and 1980 Olympian, Bill McChesney, was president of the OTC at the time and was one of the key members of the community that made this project possible.

Stadium redevelopment: New Hayward Field (2020) 
A major renovation in 2004 added a new entrance named Powell Plaza. It also moved the practice track, expanded it to 400 meters, and replaced the aging fencing bordering the complex. After Hayward Field was awarded the 2008 U.S. Olympic Trials, it underwent additional renovations in 2007. Eight light poles were installed for televised night events, and the crowned infield was removed and reconfigured. A walkway was added behind the west grandstand, and a new scoreboard was installed, thanks to a donation by alumnus Phil Knight and Nike.

On April 17, 2018, it was announced that from the summer of 2018 to 2020, Hayward field would undergo a major renovation. The renovation would demolish both current grandstands and establish a new stadium around the track with a capacity of 12,650, expandable to nearly 25,000 for major events. 

Moreover, the renovation saw Hayward Field being equipped with underground training facilities, which allow Oregon Track and Field Athletes to continue their training through rough weather. As a result, Hayward Field has a training room, two lockers rooms for male and female athletes, a team room, a meeting room, an indoor pole vault pit, an indoor shot-put pit, an indoor sand pit, a nutrition shop, a barber shop and an indoor weight room.

Major competitions 

Hayward Field has hosted USATF championships in 1986, 1993, 1999, 2001, 2009, 2011, 2015, and 2022 and the Olympic trials in 1972, 1976, 1980, 2008, 2012,  2016, and 2020. It has been the site of numerous NCAA championships, USATF Elite Running Circuit events, and the annual Nike Prefontaine Classic. The Olympic trials were hosted 2021 in the 

The World Junior Championships, now known as the World U20 Championships, were held at Hayward Field in 2014. The venue hosted the World Athletics Championships in 2022, the first time the event had been staged in the United States.

In film
Hayward Field appeared in a fictionalized staging of the Olympic trials for the 1982 film Personal Best, in the 1998 biopic of Steve Prefontaine Without Limits, and Alexi Pappas's  Tracktown (2016). It was in the background of the ROTC drill scene of Animal House

Bowerman Building
After a donation in 1990 by Bill Bowerman (1911–1999), UO's longtime track coach (1948–1973), the  Bowerman Building was added to the northwest of the track, housing locker rooms, U of O track memorabilia and the university's International Institute for Sport and Human Performance. Bowerman began a public jogging program at Hayward Field in 1963 after a visit to New Zealand, inspired by coach Arthur Lydiard.

Tower
The Hayward Field Tower was inspired by the Olympic Torch. It has nine stories and was completed in 2020 by Zahner. It stands on the northeast corner of the stadium and depicts five figures, reflecting the first 100 years of Oregon Track and Field: Bill Bowerman, Steve Prefontaine, Raevyn Rogers, Ashton Eaton and Otis Davis.

Notable athletes 

Oregon Ducks who competed at Hayward Field

Devon Allen
Kelly Blair
Dyrol Burleson
Rudy Chapa
Joaquim Cruz
Otis Davis
Lance Deal
Bill Dellinger
Ashton Eaton
Russ Francis
Jim Grelle
Claudette Groenendaal
Jordan Hasay
Harry Jerome
Daniel Kelly
Phil Knight
Kenny Moore
Bill McChesney
Jenna Prandini
Steve Prefontaine
Mel Renfro
Mack Robinson
Deajah Stevens
Galen Rupp
Alberto Salazar
Matt Centrowitz
Jerry Tarr
Andrew Wheating
Mac Wilkins
Alexi Pappas
Brianne Theisen-Eaton
Matthew Centrowitz Jr.

References

External links

 University of Oregon Athletics: Hayward Field
 Hayward Field, Architecture of the Univ. of Oregon

Sports venues in Eugene, Oregon
Defunct college football venues
Oregon Ducks football venues
Oregon Ducks track and field venues
Hayward
Athletics (track and field) venues in Oregon
College track and field venues in the United States
Sports venues completed in 1919
1919 establishments in Oregon
Diamond League venues